The fourth season of the Reborn! anime series is a compilation of episodes 74 to 101 from the series, which aired in Japan from March 15, 2008 to September 27, 2008 on TV Tokyo. Titled as Katekyō Hitman Reborn! in Japan, the Japanese television series was directed by Kenichi Imaizumi, and produced and animated by Artland. The plot, based on the Reborn! manga by Akira Amano, follows how Tsunayoshi "Tsuna" Sawada, the candidate to be the Mafia boss of the Vongola Famiglia, and his friends are accidentally sent to the future nearly 10 years later. As they arrive, they discover that the Millefiore Mafia family has been annihilating the Vongola. 

Four pieces of theme musics are used for the episodes: one opening theme and three ending themes. The opening theme is "88" by LM.C, which is used throughout the entire season. The first ending theme is "Stand Up!" by Lead, which is used until episode 76. This is followed by "Ameato" by w-inds. until episode 89, and then "Cycle" by Cherryblossom until episode 101.

Marvelous Entertainment released the season into seven DVD compilations labeled as "Burn" volumes, with each containing four episodes. Burn.1 was released on September 17, 2008. The final volume of the season, Burn.7, was released on March 18, 2009. On March 21, 2009, Japan's d-rights production company collaborated with the anime-streaming website called Crunchyroll in order to begin streaming subbed episodes of the Japanese-dubbed series worldwide. New episodes are available to everyone a week after its airing in Japan.


Episode list

References 
General
 
 
 
Specific

External links 
 Official Reborn! website 
 Official anime website 
 TV Tokyo's official anime website 

2008 Japanese television seasons
Season 4